Benoît Campargue (born 9 March 1965) is a French judoka. He competed in the men's half-lightweight event at the 1992 Summer Olympics.

Achievements

References

External links
 

1965 births
Living people
French male judoka
Olympic judoka of France
Judoka at the 1992 Summer Olympics
Place of birth missing (living people)
20th-century French people